"Dead but Rising" is a song by Danish rock band Volbeat. The song was released as the seventh single from the band's fifth studio album Outlaw Gentlemen & Shady Ladies.

Charts

References

2013 songs
2014 singles
Volbeat songs
Vertigo Records singles
Universal Records singles
Songs written by Michael Poulsen